Northern 911 (subsidiary of Northern Communications) is a company based out of Sudbury, Ontario, Canada that provides 9-1-1 call centre services for VOIP & POTS providers such as Rogers Telecom, Primus Canada, SaskTel, etc. as a Public Safety Answering Point. In addition, the company provides fire dispatch, alarm monitoring, and telematics services.

The company won the ATSI 2009 Award of Excellence. The company is the largest 911 provider in Canada.

References

External links
Website

Telecommunications companies of Canada
Companies based in Greater Sudbury
Telecommunications companies established in 1954
Privately held companies of Canada
Health care companies of Canada
Emergency communication
Emergency medicine organisations